Khalsa refers to both a community that considers Sikhism as its faith, as well as a special group of initiated Sikhs. The Khalsa tradition was initiated in 1699 by the Tenth Guru of Sikhism, Guru Gobind Singh. Its formation was a key event in the history of Sikhism. The founding of Khalsa is celebrated by Sikhs during the festival of Vaisakhi.

Guru Gobind Singh started the Khalsa tradition after his father, Guru Tegh Bahadur, was beheaded during the Islamic sharia rule of the Mughal Emperor Aurangzeb. Guru Gobind Singh created and initiated the Khalsa as a warrior with a duty to protect the innocent from religious persecution. The founding of the Khalsa started a new phase in the Sikh tradition. It formulated an initiation ceremony (amrit sanskar, nectar ceremony) and rules of conduct for the Khalsa warriors. It created a new institution for the temporal leadership of the Sikhs, replacing the earlier masand system. Additionally, the Khalsa provided a political and religious vision for the Sikh community.

Upon initiation, a Khalsa Sikh  is given the titles of Singh (male) meaning "lion" and Kaur (female) meaning "princess". The rules of life, include a behavioral code called Rahit. Some rules are  no tobacco, no intoxicants, no adultery, no Kutha meat, no modification of hair on the body, and a dress code (Five Ks).

Etymology
"Khalsa", is derived from the Arabic word "Khalis" which means "to be pure, to be clear, to be free from, to be sincere, to be true, to be straight, to be solid.".

Sikhism emerged in the northwestern part of Indian subcontinent (now parts of Pakistan and India). During the Mughal empire rule, according to professor Eleanor Nesbitt, Khalsa originally meant the land that was possessed directly by the emperor, which was different from jagir land granted to lords in exchange for a promise of loyalty and annual tribute to the emperor. 

Prior to “Guru Gobind Singh Ji”, the religious organization was organized through the masands or agents. The masands would collect revenue from rural regions for the Sikh cause, much like jagirs would for the Islamic emperor. The Khalsa, in Sikhism, came to mean pure loyalty to the Guru, and not to the intermediary masands who were increasingly becoming corrupt, states Nesbitt.

Background
The Sikhs faced religious persecution during the Mughal Empire rule. Guru Arjan Dev, the fifth Guru, was arrested and executed by Mughal Emperor Jahangir in 1606. The following Guru, Guru Hargobind formally militarised the Sikhs and emphasised the complementary nature of the temporal power and spiritual power. In 1675, Guru Tegh Bahadur, the ninth Guru of the Sikhs and the father of Guru Gobind Singh was executed by the Mughal emperor Aurangzeb for resisting religious persecution of non-Muslims, and for refusing to convert to Islam. Guru Gobind Singh’s sons were killed since they refused to convert to Islam.

Foundation

In 1699, the tenth Guru of Sikhism, Guru Gobind Singh asked Sikhs to gather at Shri Anandpur Sahib on 13 April 1699, the day of Vaisakhi, the annual harvest festival. Guru Gobind Singh addressed the congregation from the entryway of a tent pitched on a hill, now called Shri Kesgarh Sahib. He drew his sword, according to the Sikh tradition, and then asked for a volunteer from those who gathered, someone willing to sacrifice his head. One came forward, whom he took inside a tent. The Guru returned to the crowd without the volunteer, but with a bloody sword. 

He asked for another volunteer and repeated the same process of returning from the tent without anyone and with a bloodied sword four more times. After the fifth volunteer went with him into the tent, the Guru returned with all five volunteers, all safe. Rather, the Guru had slaughtered 5 goats from which the blood had appeared. He called the volunteers the Panj Pyare and the first Khalsa in the Sikh tradition. These five volunteers were : Daya Ram (Bhai Daya Singh), Dharam Das (Bhai Dharam Singh), Himmat Rai (Bhai Himmat Singh), Mohkam Chand (Bhai Mohkam Singh), and Sahib Chand (Bhai Sahib Singh). 

Guru Gobind Singh then mixed water and sugar into an iron bowl, stirring it with a double-edged sword while reciting gurbani to prepare what he called Amrit ("nectar"). He then administered this to the Panj Pyare, accompanied with recitations from the Adi Granth, thus founding the khanda ki pahul (baptism ceremony) of a Khalsa – a warrior community.  After the first five Khalsa had been baptized, the Guru asked the five to baptize him as a Khalsa. This made the Guru the sixth Khalsa, and his name changed from Guru Gobind Rai to Guru Gobind Singh.

He introduced ideas that indirectly challenged the discriminatory taxes imposed by Islamic authorities. For example, Aurangzeb had imposed taxes on non-Muslims that were collected from the Sikhs as well, for example the jizya (poll tax on non-Muslims), pilgrim tax and Bhaddar tax – the last being a tax to be paid by anyone following the Hindu ritual of shaving the head after the death of a loved one and cremation. Guru Gobind Singh Ji declared that Khalsa do not need to continue this practice, because Bhaddar is not dharam, but a bharam (illusion). Not shaving the head also meant not having to pay the taxes by Sikhs who lived in Delhi and other parts of the Mughal Empire. However, the new code of conduct also led to internal disagreements between Sikhs in the 18th century, particularly between the Nanakpanthi and the Khalsa.

“Guru Gobind Singh Ji” had a deep respect for the Khalsa, and stated that there is no difference between the True Guru and the Sangat (panth).<ref>Cole, pp. 38–39: All the battles I have won against tyranny I have fought with the devoted backing of the people. Through them only have I been able to bestow gifts, through their help I have escaped from harm. The love and generosity of these Sikhs have enriched my heart and home. Through their grace, I have attained all learning, through their help in battle I have slain all my enemies. I was born to serve them, through them I reached eminence. What would I have been without their kind and ready help? There are millions of insignificant people like me. True service is the service of these people. I am not inclined to serve others of higher caste: charity will bear fruit in this and the next world, If given to such worthy people as these. All other sacrifices are and charities are profitless. From toe to toe, whatever I call my own, all I possess and carry, I dedicate to these people.</poem></ref> Before his founding of the Khalsa, the Sikh movement had used the Sanskrit word Sisya (literally, disciple or student), but the favored term thereafter became Khalsa. Additionally, prior to the Khalsa, the Sikh congregations across India had a system of Masands appointed by the Sikh Gurus. The Masands led the local Sikh communities, local temples, collected wealth and donations for the Sikh cause. 

“Guru Gobind Singh Ji” concluded that the Masands system had become corrupt, he abolished them and introduced a more centralized system with the help of Khalsa that was under his direct supervision. These developments created two groups of Sikhs, those who initiated as Khalsa, and others who remained Sikhs but did not undertake the initiation. The Khalsa Sikhs saw themselves as a separate religious entity, while the Nanak-panthi Sikhs retained their different perspective.

The Khalsa warrior community tradition started by “Guru Gobind Singh Ji” has contributed to modern scholarly debate on pluralism within Sikhism. His tradition has survived into the modern times, with initiated Sikh referred to as Khalsa Sikh, while those who do not get baptized referred to as Sahajdhari Sikhs.

Dress and code of conduct

Guru Gobind Singh Ji initiated the Five K's tradition of the Khalsa,
 Kesh: uncut hair.
 Kangha: a wooden comb.
 Kara: an iron or steel bracelet worn on the wrist.
 Kirpan: a sword.
 Kachera: short breeches.

He also announced a code of discipline for Khalsa warriors. Tobacco, eating meat slaughtered according to Muslim ritual and sexual intercourse with any person other than spouse were forbidden. The Khalsas also agreed to never interact with those who followed rivals or their successors. The co-initiation of men and women from different castes into the ranks of Khalsa also institutionalized the principle of equality in Sikhism regardless of one's caste or gender. According to Owen and Sambhi, Guru Gobind Singh Ji's significance to the Sikh tradition has been very important, as he institutionalized the Khalsa, resisted the ongoing persecution by the Mughal Empire, and continued "the defense of Sikhism and Hinduism against the Muslim assault of Aurangzeb".

According to the Sikh Code of Conduct (Sikh Rehat Maryada), Amritdhari Khalsa Sikh men must wear a turban and the 5 K's. Baptized women are not required to tie a turban, and it remains a personal choice. It also clearly states that it is not appropriate for Sikh women to cover their face with any type of veil as practiced in the Indian, Islamic, or Judeo-Christian traditions. Piercing of the nose or ears for wearing ornaments is forbidden for Sikh men and women. Sikhs cannot wear any token of any other faith. Sikhs must not have their head bare or wear caps. They also cannot wear any ornaments piercing through any part of the body.

Prohibitions

The four prohibitions or mandatory restrictions of the Khalsa or life of Khalsa at time of Guru Gobind Singh Ji are:

 Not to disturb the natural growth of the hairs.
 Not to eat the kutha meat of any animal.
 Not to cohabit with a person other than one's spouse.
 Not to use tobacco, alcohol or any type of drugs.

A Khalsa who breaks any code of conduct is no longer a Khalsa and is excommunicated from the Khalsa Panth and must go and 'pesh' (get baptized again). Guru Gobind Singh Ji also gave the Khalsa 52 hukams or 52 specific additional guidelines while living in Nanded in 1708.

The Khalsa as a Guru (Guru Khalsa Panth) 
The Khalsa is considered equal to the Guru in Sikhism.

The five men, known as the Panj Pyare or the Five Beloved Ones, were baptized by the Guru and given the title of Singh, which means lion. They were then given the Amrit, a mixture of sugar and water stirred with a sword, and were asked to drink it. The significance of the Khalsa is reflected in the fact that Guru Gobind Singh considered it his equal. He allowed the Panj Pyare to give him Tankah, or punishment. There are instances where this occurred, as reported in the Suraj Prakash. 

Guru Gobind Singh demonstrated his respect for the Panj Pyare by bowing down to them and asking them to baptize him. This act is known as the Pahul ceremony or Amrit Sanchar, and it is still performed in Sikhism today. The Guru's act of bowing down to the Panj Pyare was a symbolic gesture of the Guru's humility and his recognition of the Panj Pyare's spiritual authority as being equal to his own.

The Panj Pyare, in turn, demonstrated their loyalty to the Guru by baptizing him and giving him the title of Singh, as well as still revering him as the Guru. This act was a recognition of the Guru's spiritual authority and his commitment to the principles of Sikhism. The Panj Pyare were not just the Guru's disciples; they were also his equals (collectively) and his companions in the struggle for justice and equality. Guru Gobind Singh wrote two famous excerpts collectively known as the Khalsa Mahima, which can be found in the Dasam Granth, and Sarbloh Granth. Below is an excerpt of the Khalsa Mahima from the Sarbloh Granth.

ਖ਼ਾਲਸਾ ਮੇਰੀ ਜਾਤ ਅਰ ਪਤ ॥ ਖ਼ਾਲਸਾ ਸੋ ਮਾ ਕੋ ਉਤਪਤ॥ ਖ਼ਾਲਸਾ ਮੇਰੋ ਭਵਨ ਭੰਡਾਰਾ॥ ਖ਼ਾਲਸੇ ਕਰ ਮੇਰੋ ਸਤਿਕਾਰਾ॥ ਖ਼ਾਲਸਾ ਮੇਰੋ ਸਵਜਨ ਪਰਵਾਰਾ॥ ਖ਼ਾਲਸਾ ਮੇਰੋ ਕਰਤ ਉਧਾਰਾ॥ ਖ਼ਾਲਸਾ ਮੇਰੋ ਪਿੰਡ ਪਰਾਨ॥ ਖ਼ਾਲਸਾ ਮੇਰੀ ਜਾਨ ਕੀ ਜਾਨ॥

romanized: khhalasa maeree jath ar path. khhalasa so ma ko outhapath. khhalasa maero bhavan bhanddara. khhalasae kar maero sathikara. khhalasa maero svajan pravara. khhalasa maero karath oudhhara. khhalasa maero pindd paran. khhalasa maeree jan kee jan.

Translation: Khalsa is my caste & creed. Because of the Khalsa, I was born. Khalsa is my world treasure. Because of the Khalsa, I have respect. Khalsa is my close family. Khalsa grants me favours. Khalsa is my body and soul. Khalsa is the breath of my life.

- Sri Manglacharan Purana

The famous contemporary Writer, Bhai Gurdas Singh (Not to be confused with Bhai Gurdas), notes in his book of compositions, or vaaran:

ਵਾਹਵਾਹਗੋਬਿੰਦਸਿੰਘਆਪੇਗੁਰੁਚੇਲਾ ॥੧॥

vaeh vaeh gobi(n)dh si(n)gh aape gur chelaa ||1||

Hail, hail (Guru) Gobind Singh; He, Himself, is the Master and Disciple too.

- Bhai Gurdas Singh Ji Vaaran

Duties and warriors

A Khalsa is enjoined, to be honest, treat everyone as equal, meditate on God, maintain his fidelity, resist tyranny and religious persecution of oneself and others.

One of the duties of the Khalsa is to practice arms. This has been deemed necessary due to the rising persecution of the rulers. Before joining the Khalsa, most of the people were from professions like farming, pottery, masonry, carpenters, Labanas, etc.

Guru Gobind Singh Ji in Oct 1708 deputed his disciple Banda Singh Bahadur Ji to lead the Khalsa in an uprising against the Mughals. Banda Singh Bahadur Ji first established a Sikh kingdom and then brought in the Land reforms in the form of breaking up large estates and distributing the land to peasants. He and his comrades were eventually defeated and executed, but he became an icon among the Sikhs. After a long exile the Khalsa regrouped under Nawab Kapur Singh, who gathered local Khalsa leaders and created Dal Khalsa, a coalition army. The Dal Khalsa fought against the Mughals and the Afghans, eventually resulting in the establishment of a number of small republics called misls (autonomous confederacies) and later in the formation of the Sikh Empire.

After the fall of the Mughal empire and the later establishment of the Sikh Empire in Punjab, the Khalsa was converted into a strong, multireligious and multinational fighting force, modernized according to European principles: the Sikh Khalsa Army which had a huge role in the expansion of the empire. Led by generals like: Maharaja Ranjit Singh Ji himself, Misr Diwan Chand and Hari Singh Nalwa. It successfully defeated all its adversaries, including the Afghan tribals and army, Hill Chiefs, Misldars, Chinese, Tibetan and Gurkhas. By the time of death of Maharaja Ranjit Singh Ji in 1839, the whole army of Sikh Empire was assessed at 120,000 men, with 250 artillery pieces. The irregular levies were included.

The official name of the state (Sikh Empire) of Sikhs was "Sarkar-i-Khalsa": Government of the Khalsa. The boundaries of this state stretched from Tibet to Afghanistan and from Kashmir to Sutlej in the south and included regions of Punjab, Khyber Pakhtunkhwa, Kashmir, Ladakh, etc. The "Sarkar-i-Khalsa" was dissolved during two wars fought against the British between 1846 and 1849.

Initiation

Initiation into the Khalsa is referred to as Amrit Sanchar (water of immortality life-cycle rite) or Khande di Pahul (Initiation with the double edged sword). Anyone from any previous religion, age, or knowledge group can take Amrit (Amrit Chhakh) when they are convinced that they are ready. This baptism is done by the Panj Pyare in front of the Guru Granth Sahib. The devotee must arrive at the place of baptism, usually a Gurdwara, in the morning after bathing completely including having washed their hair and must be wearing the 5 articles of the Khalsa uniform. 

After baptism, the new Singh or Kaur must abide by the four restrictions or must get re-baptised if they break any of them. Jasjpit Singh in Lucinda Mosher book describes taking Amrit as a huge commitment, "You are making a commitment to God, to God's creation, to yourself – and you're giving up yourself. It is like giving up your own ego and accepting God into your life – and accepting yourself as one with the entire creation."

Initial tensions with the non-Khalsa disciples

With the creation of Khalsa, Guru Gobind Singh Ji had abolished all existing social divisions in line with the teachings of Sri Guru Nanak Dev Ji. In their new order, the former lowest of the low would stand with the former highest; all would become one and drink from the same vessel. All previous beliefs relating to family, occupation, customs and ceremonies were declared useless by the Guru. This caused discomfort to the conservative followers of the Guru and they protested. Many departed from the ceremony, but the Guru declared that the low castes should be raised and would dwell next to him.

The newswriter of the Mughal government, Ghulam Mohyiuddin, reporting to the emperor wrote: 

Sri Gur Sobha (18th century) by Senapati contains two sections (adhyays) on the controversies that arose, when Shri Guru Gobind Singh Ji's disciples in Delhi heard the news of his new order. Much of the controversy stated in Sri Gur Sobha revolves around bhaddar, the ritual shaving of head after death of a close relative, which was discouraged by Sri Guru Gobind Singh Ji. According to Sainapti, while creating the Khalsa, Sri Guru Gobind Singh Ji said that bhaddar is bharam (illusion), and not dharam.

Tensions developed between the Punjabi Khatri disciples of the Guru in Delhi, and members of the newly formed Khalsa. A prominent Khatri disciple was expelled from the place of worship (dharmasala) for refusing to join the Khalsa. Another disciple was expelled for eating with him, starting a chain of further expulsions. The expelled disciples convened a community gathering, at which two wealthy Khatris demanded that the Khalsa produce a written order from the Guru that a new mandatory code of conduct had been promulgated.

A Khatri family that refused to follow the bhaddar ritual was boycotted by the Khatri community. The Khatri council (panch) closed the bazaar to pressure the Khalsa. The Khalsa petitioned the state officials to intervene, who forced reopening of the shops. Later, peace was established between the two groups in a sangat (congregation). However, hostility between some Khatris and the Khalsa persisted in the later years.

In contrast to the Khalsa Sikh, a Sahajdhari Sikh is one who reveres the teachings of the Sikh Gurus, but has not undergone the initiation. Sahajdhari Sikhs do not accept some or all elements of the dress and behavioral codes of the Khalsa Sikhs.

Contemporary status

Today, the Khalsa is respected by the entire gamut of Sikhs; however, not all Sikhs are Amritdharis The issue of Khalsa code of conduct has led to several controversies. In the early 1950s, a serious split occurred in the Canadian Sikh community, when the Khalsa Diwan Society in Vancouver, British Columbia elected a clean-shaven Sikh to serve on its management committee. Although most of the early Sikh immigrants to Canada were non-Khalsa, and a majority of the members of the society were clean-shaven non-Khalsa Sikhs, a faction objected to the election of a non-Khalsa to the management committee. The factions in Vancouver and Victoria, British Columbia broke away from the Khalsa Diwan Society and established their own gurdwara society called Akali Singh.

The Khalsa has been predominantly a male institution in Sikh history, with Khalsa authority with the male leaders. In the contemporary era, it has become open to women but its authority remains with Sikh men.

3HO is a western sect that emerged in 1971, founded by Harbhajan Singh Khalsa also known as Yogi Bhajan. It requires both men and women to wear turbans, and adopt the surname Khalsa.

Each year the Khalsa display their military skills around the world at a festival called Hola Mohalla. During Hola Mohalla, military exercises are performed alongside mock battles followed by kirtan and valor poetry competitions. The Khalsa also lead the Sikhs in the annual Vaisakhi parade.

Demography
 

Worldwide there are nearly 25-30 million Khalsa Sikhs who follow the 5 Ks strictly and tied turban having long hair with moustache and beard.

See also
 Chakram
 Gatka
 Khalsa Heritage Memorial Complex
 Langar
 Nihang
 Sects of Sikhism
 Shastar Vidya
 Sikh history
 Rehat
 Prohibitions in Sikhism
 Diet in Sikhism
 Meat consumption among Sikhs
 Khalsa bole

References

Cited sources

  Dhavan, P. (2011) When Sparrows Became Hawks: The Making of the Sikh Warrior Tradition, 1699–1799, Oxford University Press: Oxford. ISBN 978-0-19-975655-1.

External links

Who and What is a Khalsa?
Creation of the Khalsa
Rise of the Khalsa
Order of The Khalsa

Punjabi words and phrases
Warrior code
Sikh groups and sects